Tovo may refer to a pair of Italian municipalities:

Tovo di Sant'Agata, in the Province of Sondrio, Lombardy
Tovo San Giacomo, in the Province of Savona, Liguria